Chris Schultz is an American ice hockey coach and former player who was twice named the NCAA Division III coach of the year.

Career
Schultz began his college career in 1993 and played four years for the ice hockey team at Geneseo State. Schultz was a two-year captain of the Ice Knights and his playing days ended upon his graduation with dual degree in special education and history. He returned to his alma mater three years later as an assistant coach under current RIT associate coach, Brian Hills. He remained with the club for three seasons before taking over at his high school alma mater, the Aquinas Institute.

In 2006, after losing Jason Lammers to Division I, Geneseo hired Schultz as their new head coach. He was taking over a program that had won two consecutive SUNYAC titles and appeared primed to make the next step in the NCAA tournament. Schultz became the third head coach in three seasons for the Ice Knights and this took a toll on recruiting. Unfortunately, the team regressed in his second season and the club posted a sub .500 record in his second season, the only sub .500 of his career to date. While the team improved markedly the following year, the program was hit with a postseason ban in 2010 because the university had used financial aid grants to entice Canadian players to the school. Of the 21 grants awarded to Canadian students, 19 went to members of the ice hockey team.

Despite the university's unintentional infraction, Schultz remained with the team and the program began to consistently rise over the course of several years. In 2014, Schultz led the team to their first ever regular season SUNYAC title and, though they lost in the title game of their conference tournament, they earned one of the three at-large NCAA bids. The Knights won the program's first two NCAA games versus Nichols and Norwich to reach the Frozen Four (Lewiston, Maine) for the first time and, though they lost to eventual champion St. Norbert, Schultz was selected as the National Coach of the Year. In 2016, the Knights won the SUNYAC final, beat Salve Regina and Williams College, earning a spot once again in the Frozen Four (Lake Placid) and was once again a recipient of the Edward Jeremiah Award National Coach of the Year, though this time the honor was shared with Peter Belisle.  In 2019, after winning the SUNYAC once again, the Knights found themselves back in the Frozen Four (Stevens-Point, Wisconsin) after defeating Manhattanville College.  The Knights eventually fell to Norwich University in the national semifinal game.  The three appearances in the national semifinal helped raise the profile of the program but Schultz didn't stop there. Beginning in 2018, Geneseo State won four consecutive SUNYAC Tournament titles, including 5 of out of 6 years holding the crown, and made the Frozen Four in consecutive tournaments (discounting the cancellations due to COVID-19). In 2022 he led the Knights to the NCAA Division III National Championship game in Lake Placid for the first time where they ultimately fell to Adrian. Schultz is the only head coach in Geneseo hockey history to have won any NCAA tournament games.  In addition to the aforementioned national coach of the year awards, Schultz is also a five-time SUNYAC Coach of the Year recipient, a Rochester Press-Radio Club Coach of the Year (2019), and was inducted into the Aquinas Institute Hall of Fame in 2017.

Statistics

Regular season and playoffs

Head coaching record

References

External links

Living people
Year of birth missing (living people)
American ice hockey coaches
American men's ice hockey players
Ice hockey people from New York (state)
People from Chili, New York
State University of New York at Geneseo alumni
State University of New York at Geneseo faculty